Quarterthing (stylized as QUARTERTHING) is the debut studio album by Chicago rapper Joey Purp. It was released on September 7, 2018. Music videos were created for "Bag Talk" and "Aw Sh*t!".

Critical reception

Kenan Draughorne of HipHopDX gave the album a 4.2 out of 5, calling it "an impressive step forward, instantly captivating with undeniable replay value." Sheldon Pearce of Pitchfork gave the album an 8.3 out of 10, saying: "These are songs that refuse to be beholden to what came before, songs that understand and even cherish their connections to music of the past but have entirely different destinations in mind."

Consequence of Sound placed it at number 41 on the "Top 50 Albums of 2018" list.

Track listing

References

Further reading

External links
 
 

2018 debut albums
Hip hop albums by American artists